The Râușor is a right tributary of the Mara in Maramureș County, Romania. It discharges into the Mara in the village Mara. Its main tributaries are the Izvorul Negru and the Hopșia.

References

Rivers of Romania
Rivers of Maramureș County